The Kvalsaukan Bridge is a bridge that crosses the Hognfjorden in Sortland Municipality in Nordland county, Norway. It is part of the Norwegian County Road 82 between the town of Sortland and the neighboring Andøy Municipality.

The Kvalsaukan Bridge was opened in 1975. It was one of four bridges that were built in the 1970s to connect the islands of Vesterålen to each other. The other bridges that were built during that period are the Sortland Bridge, Andøy Bridge, and Hadsel Bridge. Together with the Tjeldsund Bridge near Harstad, these bridges connect the islands of Vesterålen to the mainland. The Kvalsaukan Bridge is the only one of these four bridges that was never a toll bridge.

See also
List of bridges in Norway
List of bridges in Norway by length
List of bridges
List of bridges by length

References

Sortland
Road bridges in Nordland
Bridges completed in 1975
1975 establishments in Norway
Norwegian County Road 82